Pseudotropheus ater is a species of cichlid endemic to Lake Malawi where it is only known from around Chinyamwezi Island and Chinyankwazi Island.  It prefers areas with rocky substrates at depths of from  where it grazes from the rock surfaces.  This species can reach a length of  SL.  It can also be found in the aquarium trade.

References

ater
ater
Taxa named by Jay Richard Stauffer Jr.
Fish described in 1988
Taxonomy articles created by Polbot
Taxobox binomials not recognized by IUCN